Before the Women's Pro Softball League (WPSL) decided to suspend play for the 2001 season, it held its regularly scheduled 2001 WPSL Senior Draft on December 2, 2000, at Adam's Mark Hotel San Antonio Riverwalk in conjunction with the National Fastpitch Coaches Association (NFCA) Convention.  As the league did not resume play until 2004, many draftees never played in the league. However, some did, even making an All-Star team.

Following are the 24 selections from the 2001 WPSL draft, along with their playing experience, if any (and recorded on the NPF's historical rosters.

Position key: 
C = Catcher; UT = Utility infielder; INF = Infielder; 1B = First base; 2B =Second base SS = Shortstop; 3B = Third base; OF = Outfielder; RF = Right field; CF = Center field; LF = Left field;  P = Pitcher; RHP = right-handed Pitcher; LHP = left-handed Pitcher; DP =Designated player
Positions are listed as combined for those who can play multiple positions.

Draft Selections

Round 1

Round 2

Round 3

Round 4

Round 5

Round 6

References

External links 
 

2001 in softball